Victory at Sea was an America indie rock band formed in 1996, from members of bands the Swirlies and Spore, in the Boston, Massachusetts region. It consisted of vocalist/guitarist Mona Elliott, bassist Mel Lederman and drummer Christina Files (later to be replaced by a succession of drummers Fin Moore, Carl Eklof, and Dave Norton). Their most recent albums Memories Fade and All Your Things Are Gone were released by the independent record label Gern Blandsten Records in 2004 and 2006 respectively. On September 6, 2007, the band announced on their Myspace page that they had disbanded, though they stated that all of the members have new musical endeavors. Barney later played with former Metal Hearts member Anar Badalov as Travels, now disbanded.

Discography
Easier Than Living (EP 1998) (Villa Villakula)
The Dark Is Just the Night (1999) (Slowdime Records)
Helms & Victory At Sea (Split EP with Helms, 2000) (Kimchee Records)
Carousel (2001) (Kimchee Records)
The Good Night (2002) (Kimchee Records)
Memories Fade (2004) (Gern Blandsten Records)
All Your Things Are Gone (2006) (Gern Blandsten Records)

External links
 Victory at Sea page at Gern Blandsten Records website
 [ allmusic.com] biographical article
 bands myspace page

Indie rock musical groups from Massachusetts
Musical groups from Boston